Packer's National Bank Building is located at 4939 South 24th Street in the South Omaha Main Street Historic District in south Omaha, Nebraska. It was built in 1907. In 1984, it was designated an Omaha Landmark and, in 1985, it was listed on the National Register of Historic Places.

About
Designed by Thomas Kimball in the Second Renaissance Revival Style, the Packer's National Bank Building was the home of Packer’s National Bank. The bank was originally established in 1891, and its growth was closely tied to the Omaha Stockyards. Many of the bank’s early officers were executives in Omaha's meat packing industry. The bank left the building in 1979 and, in 1984, the building was renovated for use as offices and apartments.

See also
 Vinton Street Commercial Historic District

References

National Register of Historic Places in Omaha, Nebraska
Commercial buildings completed in 1907
Banks based in Omaha, Nebraska
Landmarks in South Omaha, Nebraska
Banks established in 1891
Meatpacking industry in Omaha, Nebraska
Bank buildings on the National Register of Historic Places in Nebraska
1891 establishments in Nebraska